The 1st Presidents Cup was held between September 16 and 18, 1994. It was played at the Robert Trent Jones Golf Club in Gainesville, Virginia, USA. The United States team won the competition by a margin of 20–12. The honorary chairman was former President of the United States Gerald R. Ford.

Format
The United States team had 12 players including a captain who participated in the event. The International team had 12 players plus a non-playing captain. On the first and second day four-ball was played in the morning and foursomes were played in the afternoon. On the third day only singles were played.

Teams
Greg Norman, ranked second in the International team, withdrew a few days before the event, because of illness. He was replaced by Bradley Hughes who was the highest ranked player available. A number of "international" players were unavailable because of other commitments. Ernie Els, ranked third, played in the Dunhill British Masters, while Masashi "Jumbo" Ozaki and Tsuneyuki "Tommy" Nakajima, ranked fifth and ninth, played in the ANA Open the same week.

OWGR as of September 11, 1996, the last ranking before the Cup

Friday's matches

Morning four-ball

Afternoon foursomes

Saturday's matches

Morning four-ball

Afternoon foursomes

Sunday's matches

Singles

Individual player records
Each entry refers to the win–loss–half record of the player.

United States

International

External links
Official scores

Presidents Cup
Golf in Virginia
Presidents Cup
Presidents Cup
Presidents Cup
Presidents Cup